The Lakeland Classic was a golf tournament on the Buy.com Tour from 1997 to 2000. It was played at Grasslands Golf & Country Club in Lakeland, Florida.

The purse in 2000 was US$400,000, with $72,000 going to the winner.

Winners

References

Former Korn Ferry Tour events
Golf in Florida
Sports in Lakeland, Florida
Recurring sporting events established in 1997
Recurring sporting events disestablished in 2000
1997 establishments in Florida
2000 disestablishments in Florida